Sheridan Japanese School is a public charter school in Sheridan, Oregon, United States. The school has been accredited by the Northwest Association of Accredited Schools since 2000. It is a Japanese-language school.

Academics
In 2008, 100% of the school's seniors received their high school diploma. Of 4 students, 4 graduated and 0 dropped out.

References

External links

 Sheridan Japanese School

High schools in Yamhill County, Oregon
Japanese-American culture in Oregon
Sheridan, Oregon
Educational institutions established in 1994
Charter schools in Oregon
Public high schools in Oregon
Public middle schools in Oregon
Public elementary schools in Oregon
1994 establishments in Oregon